Codru (plural form: codri) is the name of the forests that grow in the hilly part of central Moldova.

History
During the Middle Ages most of the Principality of Moldavia's hills were forested, and the forested area in general was referred to as codrii, with bigger regional forests often given names such as Codrii Cosminului (Cosmin Codrii), Codrii Plonini (Plonini Codrii), Codrii Hotinului (Hotin Codrii; also Pădurea Hotinului, Hotin Forest), Codrii Orheiului (Orhei Codrii), Codrii Lăpușnei (Lăpușna Codrii).

Although the hills represent about 80%–90% of the territory of Moldova, the forested area has decreased after 1800 due to intensive agriculture of the fertile land to about 12%. At the moment the area of the forest is continuously decreasing, both in surface and ecologically. In early 21st century the area is estimated under 35%. Despite the fact that there are still several big forests that have been preserved, including some designated as national parks, the country currently suffers from acute insufficiency of forests (with respect to its normal ecology), translated into poorer and less water for human and irrigation use.

These uplands are interlaced by deep, flat valleys, ravines, and landslide-scoured depressions separated by sharp ridges. Steep, forest-clad slopes account for much of the codrii.

The highest point in Moldova, Bălănești Hill (Dealul Bălănești; 429 m or 1,407 ft) is located in the Cornești Hills, located between Prut and Răut rivers, in the core codrii area.

See also
Codru Reserve

External links
 1992 Postage Stamps for the Codrii Nature Preserve

Forests of Moldova
Environment of Moldova